Ibrahim is the Arabic name for Abraham, a Biblical patriarch and prophet in Islam.

For the Islamic view of Ibrahim, see Abraham in Islam.

Ibrahim may also refer to:
 Ibrahim (name), a name (and list of people with the name)
 Ibrahim (sura), a sura of the Qur'an
 Ibrahim el Awal, a Hunt-class destroyer that served in the Egyptian navy under that name 1951-56
 Ibrahim prize, a prize to recognise good governance in Africa
 "Ibrahim", a song by David Friedman from Shades of Change

See also
 Ibrahimzai, a Pashtun tribe of Afghanistan
 Ibrahima
 Abraham (disambiguation)
 Avraham (disambiguation)